John Arthur Getreu (born August 26, 1944) is an American serial killer who was convicted of one murder during 1963 in West Germany and convicted of two more that took place in 1973 and 1974 in the United States. He is currently serving life imprisonment at California Health Care Facility.

Crimes
Convicted:
 In 1964, at the age of 19, in Germany, where he had been  living as the son of a sergeant major in the U.S. Army, for the June 8, 1963 rape and killing, when he was 18 years old, of the 15 or 16 year-old daughter of a U.S. Army chaplain likewise stationed. The U.S. Army base was in Bad Kreuznach, West Germany. Getreu was convicted as a juvenile under German law, and given a prison sentence of 10 years in prison. As a juvenile and foreign national, the German court stated that Getreu could be deported after parole, after serving 2 years. Getreu was "eventually returned to the United States after serving a short sentence". His release and deportation were in 1969.
 On January 19, 1975, in Palo Alto, for the rape of a 17-year-old Girl Scout Explorer for whose troop he had become a leader and guardian at events, with violence (threatened strangulation), in her home, for which he pleaded guilty to statutory rape and received a sentence of six months in jail, 5 months suspended, where he was released after 30-days and payment of a $200 fine.
 On September 15, 2021, for the March 1974 murder of 21-year-old Janet Ann Taylor, a daughter of former Stanford University athletic director Charles Taylor. Janet was found strangled along Sand Hill Road in the foothills, near Woodside, above the campus in an area now known as the Dish. He was found guilty of murder and sentenced on November 5, to 7-years to life in prison.
 On January 10, 2023 (guilty plea), for the 1973 sexual assault and murder of 21-year-old Leslie Perlov in Stanford, California (charged in November 2018 based on DNA evidence). The Perlov murder had many suspects in the case, but all were ruled out until November 24, 2018, when Getreu was arrested by authorities after crime scene DNA was linked to him through the genetic genealogy work of CeCe Moore using the site, GEDmatch. After that, the Taylor murder DNA was linked to Perlov DNA, so Getreu was charged with both murders. Getreu pled not guilty to both murders and was scheduled to go on trial for the Perlov murder in September 2020. However, the trial was postponed due to Getreu falling ill with a brain aneurysm. The trial was rescheduled for January 7, 2021 but again was rescheduled, for 2022. However, Getreu pleaded guilty to her murder on January 10, 2023 and is expected to be sentenced on April 26, 2023.

Suspected:
1969 attempted murder of then–19-year-old Sharon Lucchese.
 A journalist has reported that there is evidence raising suspicions that Getreu was involved in the 1980 murder of 15-year-old Theresa Smith, in Newark, Ohio. Her body was found at the bottom of a bank on Ohio State Route 16. As of February 2022, no charges had been filed regarding that suspicion; the journalist, Californian Grace Kahng, reported that Getreu had lived two blocks from from the victim's house.

Media 
Information on the early cases against Getreu was covered as an addendum to a broadcast primarily covering the Stanford-area murder of Arlis Perry, in a February 2020 episode of the Australian Casefile True Crime Podcast.

See also 
 CeCe Moore
 List of serial killers in the United States
 Parabon NanoLabs

Further reading

References

1944 births
20th-century American criminals
American male criminals
American murderers of children
American people convicted of murder
American people convicted of rape
American prisoners sentenced to life imprisonment
American rapists
American serial killers
Criminals of the San Francisco Bay Area
Living people
Male serial killers
People convicted of murder by California
People convicted of murder by Germany
People from Newark, Ohio
Prisoners sentenced to life imprisonment by California
Violence against women in the United States